Allegro barbaro (or Allegro barbara) may refer to:

 Allegro barbaro (Alkan), a piece for solo piano by Charles-Valentin Alkan from his set of studies Op. 35
 Allegro barbaro (Bartók), a piece for solo piano by Béla Bartók
 Allegro barbaro (Ornstein), 1st movement of the Piano Quintet op.92 (1927) by Leo Ornstein
 Allegro barbaro (Smith), a piece for solo piano by Dave Smith from his 1st Piano Concert (1985-6)
 Allegro barbaro (album), an album by the German heavy metal band Die Apokalyptischen Reiter
 Allegro barbaro (film), a film by Miklós Jancsó